Slettmarkpiggen is a mountain on the border of Vang Municipality and Lom Municipality in Innlandet county, Norway. The mountain is surrounded by several other notable mountains including Store Svartdalspiggen to the northeast; Mesmogtinden, Langedalstinden, Kvitskardtinden, and Torfinnstindene to the east; Galdeberget and Oksedalshøi to the southwest; Slettmarkkampen to the west; Snøholstinden and Store Rauddalseggi to the northwest; and Storådalshøi to the north.

See also
List of mountains of Norway by height

References

Jotunheimen
Vang, Innlandet
Lom, Norway
Mountains of Innlandet